Felicio Anando Brown Forbes (born 28 August 1991) is a professional footballer who  plays for Chinese Super League club Qingdao Hainiu as a forward. Born in Germany, and having represented Germany at youth level, he represents the Costa Rica national team.

Club career
Brown Forbes was born in Berlin, to a Costa Rican father and a German mother, and spent his first six years in Limón. He made his professional debut for FC Carl Zeiss Jena during the 2010–11 3. Liga season in a 1–1 home draw with VfB Stuttgart II.

In July 2014, Brown Forbes moved from Krylia Sovetov, signing a two-year contract with fellow Russian side FC Ufa.

On 24 February 2017, Forbes joined Anzhi Makhachkala on loan for the remainder of the 2016–17 season.

On 11 September 2017, he signed with Amkar Perm.

On 20 July 2018, Brown Forbes joined Korona Kielce on a two-year deal. On 29 June 2019, Brown Forbes left Korona Kielce.

On 28 June 2019, Raków Częstochowa announced they had signed Brown Forbes on a one-year contract.

On 5 October 2020, he moved to another Ekstraklasa club Wisła Kraków. On 11 March 2022, he left the club by mutual consent.

On 28 April 2022, he joined Chinese Super League club Wuhan Yangtze River.

In February 2023, he joined Chinese Super League club Qingdao Hainiu.

International career
Initially, Brown Forbes was willing to play internationally for Costa Rica, but he later was called to the youth teams of Germany, starting to prioritize his country of birth above his origins. However, because Germany has not called him for its national teams since 2011, Brown Forbes began to show signs of interest in playing international matches with Costa Rica. As of 12 September 2013, he highlighted the Costa Rican qualification for the 2014 FIFA World Cup on his Twitter account. In November 2013, Brown Forbes confirmed to the Costa Rican press that he wanted to play for Los Ticos.

Career statistics

Club

Notes

References

External links
 

1991 births
Living people
German people of Costa Rican descent
Costa Rican people of German descent
Costa Rican emigrants
Footballers from Berlin
German footballers
Association football forwards
Costa Rica international footballers
Germany youth international footballers
Hertha Zehlendorf players
Hertha BSC players
1. FC Nürnberg players
1. FC Nürnberg II players
FC Carl Zeiss Jena players
Rot-Weiß Oberhausen players
PFC Krylia Sovetov Samara players
FC Ufa players
FC Rostov players
FC Arsenal Tula players
FC Anzhi Makhachkala players
FC Amkar Perm players
Korona Kielce players
Raków Częstochowa players
Wisła Kraków players
Wuhan F.C. players
Qingdao Hainiu F.C. (1990) players
Regionalliga players
3. Liga players
Russian Premier League players
Russian First League players
Ekstraklasa players
Chinese Super League players
German expatriate footballers
German expatriate sportspeople in Russia
Expatriate footballers in Russia
German expatriate sportspeople in Poland
Expatriate footballers in Poland
German expatriate sportspeople in China
Expatriate footballers in China